The Racecourse is an open area on the River Wear  in Durham, England of  total that has been used as a sports ground since at least 1733. It forms part of Durham University's sports facilities as well as hosting local sports clubs. The Racecourse cricket ground, which has hosted first class matches, has been used since at least 1843, and is the home ground of Durham University's cricket team. The Racecourse also contains squash, tennis and fives courts, rugby, hockey and football pitches, and boathouses.

As well as use by Durham University, the Racecourse is known for hosting two annual events, the Durham Regatta and Durham Miners' Gala. With the exception of the riverside path, which is owned by Durham County Council, the Racecourse is owned by Durham University.

History

Before it was a racecourse, the Racecourse was known as Smelt Haugh or Smiddy Haughs and is thought to have been a smithy for the Prior of Durham. It was first recorded as being used for horse racing in 1733. At its peak, the course had a stone grandstand and attracted 80,000 spectators for a two-day event in 1873. Racing continued at the site until around 1887. From 1815 there was an annual boat procession along the River Wear at the Racecourse, celebrating Wellington's victory at the Battle of Waterloo. In 1834 this became the Durham Regatta, the second oldest regatta in England. The Durham Miners' Gala (established 1871) has been held annually at the Racecourse since 1872.

Cricket has been played on the Racecourse since at least 1843, when Durham University played the first recorded game there. This predates Cambridge's first game at Fenner's (1848) and Oxford's first game at  The Parks (1881), making the Racecourse the oldest university cricket ground in England. In the 1840s the land was owned by the Bishop of Chester, who leased it to Durham City Cricket Club (established in 1829) in 1844. By the late 1840s, however, the lease had passed to the university. Durham City Cricket Club continued to play at The Racecourse cricket ground until 1887, when they moved "amid mutterings of discontent" to Green Lane Cricket Ground at the east end of the Racecourse. Horse racing was also stopped by the university at the same time, so that from 1888 the ground was solely used by the university.

On 16–17 June 2012 the Racecourse hosted the Olympic torch as part of the London 2012 Olympic torch relay.

Cricket ground

The Racecourse's most significant facility is its cricket ground, which has been used by Durham University since 1843. It has a capacity of 8,500 (2015).

The Racecourse cricket ground stands at the east end of the Racecourse. It had the honour of hosting Durham County Cricket Club's first match as a first-class county in 1992, against Leicestershire. Between 1992 and 1994, Durham CCC played seven games there in the County Championship, seven List A games and a three-day game against Australia, which was notable for being Ian Botham's last match as a professional cricketer. Since Durham CCC moved into The Riverside Ground, which was completed in 1995, the ground has continued to host Durham University, Durham University Centre of Cricketing Excellence and Durham MCC University matches, which included 19 first-class matches against County sides as well as games in the MCC Universities Championship and BUCS Premier League. It was also used from 2000 - 2008 as the home for Durham
CCC's Academy team, which played 50 North East Premier League matches on the ground. In 2007, it also hosted a three-day match between the touring West Indies team and the MCC. and a one-day match between the MCC and the touring Bangladesh A team in 2008. It hosted three women's one-day internationals in 2002 and a Durham Women one-day match against Lancashire Women in 2014, retrospectively considered to have been List A matches.

The ground has hosted 28 first-class matches (excluding one abandoned without play) and 12 List A matches as of August 2022.

Game Information:
{| class="wikitable"
|-
! Game Type
! No. of Games
|-
| County Championship matches
| 7
|-
| University matches (with first class status)
| 19
|-
| Tour matches
| 2
|-
| Total first class matches
| 28
|-
| Limited-over county matches
| 7
|-
| Limited-over tour matches
| 1
|-
| Women's one-day internationals
| 3
|-
| Women's limited-over county matches
| 1
|-
| Total List A matches
| 12
|}

Game Statistics: first-class:
{| class="wikitable"
|-
! Category
! Information
|-
| Highest Team Score
| West Indies (534/8dec against MCC) in 2007
|-
| Lowest Team Score
| Durham UCCE (46 against Nottinghamshire) in 2006
|-
| Best Batting Performance
| Runako Morton (201 Runs for West Indies against MCC in 2007
|-
| Best Bowling Performance
| Simon Brown (7/70 for Durham against Australia) in 1992
|}

Game Statistics: one-day matches:
{| class="wikitable"
|-
! Category
! Information
|-
| Highest Team Score
| Surrey (330/6 in 39 overs against Durham) in 1992
|-
| Lowest Team Score
| Derbyshire (169 in 44 overs against Durham) in 1993
|-
| Best Batting Performance
| Darren Bicknell (125 Runs for Surrey against Durham) in 1992
|-
| Best Bowling Performance
| Neil Lenham (5/28 for Sussex against Durham) in 1993
|}

Other sports facilities

In addition to the cricket ground, these include grass pitches for rugby, football and hockey. The cricket pavilion also houses two fives courts and two squash courts. The Durham Amateur Rowing Club boathouse is located at the east (up stream) end of the Racecourse, while St Cuthbert's Society Boat Club is at the west (down stream) end.

In the eastern part of the Racecourse is Durham City's Green Lane Cricket Ground, which has been used for cricket since at least 1866 and was used by Durham County Cricket Club (then a minor county) in the Minor Counties Cricket Championship in 
1899, 1904 and 1975 to 1984, and in the Minor Counties Trophy in 1988 and 1989. It hosted a single List A match for the county in 1979 and has hosted 16 List A matches for Durham Women. There is a bowling green adjacent to Green Lane cricket ground which is used by Durham City Bowling Club.

Durham Miners' Gala

Durham Miners' Gala was first held at the Racecourse in 1872, which was the gala's second edition. All editions of the gala have since been held at the Racecourse. The event is typically held in mid-July, though has on occasions been held in August. The Racecourse is the location of the speeches held at the culmination of the Gala march. At its peak, 250,000 people attended the Gala.

Durham Regatta

Durham Regatta has been held annually at the Racecourse since 1834 and is the second oldest regatta in England.

See also

Maiden Castle sports centre – Durham University's other major sports complex
Riverside Ground – Durham County Cricket Club's current home

References

External links
 Cricinfo Website - Ground Page

Cricket grounds in County Durham
Sport at Durham University
Durham University
Sport in Durham, England
Sports venues completed in 1733
Defunct horse racing venues in England
University sports venues in the United Kingdom